CSCL Globe is a container ship owned and operated by COSCO Shipping and previously, China Shipping Container Lines (CSCL). The first of a class of five ships intended for Asia-Europe trade routes, she was the largest container ship in the world at the time of her launch in November 2014, with a maximum capacity of 19,100 twenty-foot containers.

Construction
CSCL Globe and her four sister ships were ordered by CSCL in May 2013. The ship was constructed by Hyundai Heavy Industries at their shipyard in Ulsan, South Korea, with the first steel for the hull cut in January 2014. CSCL Globe completed her sea trials in October 2014, and was delivered to CSCL in November 2014. Upon its entry into service, CSCL Globe superseded Mærsk's  as the world's largest operational container ship.

Design and engineering
The vessel is constructed to DNV GL class standards. The ship operates with a crew of 23.

CSCL Globes main engine is a MAN B&W 12S90ME-C with a total output power of 69,720 kW at 84 rpm.

Career
CSCL Globe left Shanghai, China, on her maiden voyage in early December 2014, and arrived at its first port of call – Felixstowe, England – on 7January 2015. In January 2015, CSCL Globe was superseded as the world's largest container ship by Mediterranean Shipping Company's , which exceeded her TEU capacity by 124 containers.

After the merger of the ultimate parent company, China Shipping Group, with China Ocean Shipping (Group) Corporation (COSCO), forming China COSCO Shipping, the livery of the ship has changed from "China Shipping Line" to "COSCO Shipping".

See also
 List of largest container ships
 Largest container shipping companies

References

External links
 CSCL Globe at ShipsReview.net

2014 ships
Container ships
Merchant ships of China
Ships built by Hyundai Heavy Industries Group
Ships of COSCO Shipping